Rhytiphora piligera is a species of beetle in the family Cerambycidae. It was described by William Sharp Macleay in 1826. It is known from Australia.

References

External links
Original description: Mac Leay, William Sharp (1827)."Catalogue of Insects, collected by Captain King, R. N." Narrative of a Survey of the Intertropical and Western Coasts of Australia Performed Between the Years 1818 and 1822. 2: 452. 

piligera
Beetles described in 1826